Nikolai Grigoryevich Grinko or Mykola Hryhorovych Hrynko (22 May 1920, Kherson – 10 April 1989, Kyiv was a Soviet and Ukrainian actor.

Biography 
Nikolai Grinko was born on 22 May 1920) in Kherson, then in Ukrainian SSR (now Ukraine).He died on 10 April 1989  in Kiev, Ukrainian SSR, USSR (now Ukraine).

His wife was Ayshe Rafetovna Chulak-ogly (born 1932), a violinist of the State Radio and Television Symphony Orchestra of the Ukrainian SSR, a jazz-symphonic ensemble Dnepr.

Career 
In 1961, Mykola Hrynko switched to cinema. But at his "native" Dovzhenko Film Studio, he was not considered a "native" actor, he was filmed very little, and was not offered any leading roles. His screenplay for Ivan Franko's Stolen Happiness had been lying in the studio offices for 6 years and was put on the shelf. 

Grinko is well known for his roles in the films of Andrei Tarkovsky, including: Ivan's Childhood, Andrei Rublev, Solaris, Mirror, and Stalker. 

He also starred in the 1981 film Teheran 43.

Selected filmography

Peace to Him Who Enters (1961) - Shofyor-amerikanets
Ivan's Childhood (1962) - Gryaznov
Velká cesta (1963) - Velitel brigády
Shadows of Forgotten Ancestors (1965) - Vatag
War and Peace (1966-1967, part 1, 3) - Dessalles
Andrei Rublev (1966) - Daniil Chyorny
Subject for a Short Story (1969) - Anton Pavlovich Chekhov
Dangerous Tour (1969) - Andrei Maksimovich
Solaris (1972) - Nik Kelvin, father of Kris Kelvin
A Lover's Romance (1974) - Vitse-admiral
Adventures in a City that does not Exist (1974) - Don Quixote
Mirror (1975) - Printing house director
Afonya (1975) - dyadya Yego
Woodpeckers Don't Get Headaches (1975) - otets Mukhina
The Adventures of Buratino (1976, TV Movie) - Papa Carlo
One-Two, Soldiers Were Going... (1977) - polkovnik, komandir Konstantina
Twenty Days Without War (1977) - polkovnik Aleksandrov
Osvobození Prahy (1977) - General Omar Bradley
Stalker (1979) - Professor
The Adventures of the Elektronic (1979, TV Mini-Series) - Professor Gromov
The Bodyguard (1979)
The Youth of Peter the Great (1980) - Nektaryi
At the Beginning of Glorious Days (1980)
Teheran 43 (1981) - Hermolin
Be My Husband (1981) - Holiday-maker, husband of the theatregoer

References

External links

1920 births
1989 deaths
20th-century Ukrainian male actors
Actors from Kherson
Communist Party of the Soviet Union members
Recipients of the title of Merited Artist of Ukraine
Recipients of the title of People's Artists of Ukraine
Soviet male film actors
Soviet World War II pilots
Ukrainian male film actors
Deaths from leukemia
Burials at Baikove Cemetery